Isela Vega Durazo (5 November 1939 – 9 March 2021) was a Mexican actress, singer-songwriter, and filmmaker.

Career
In 1957, she was chosen as "Princess of the Carnival" in Hermosillo. Shortly afterwards, she began modeling. In 1960, she began her acting career, which continued until her death. Her most widely known role is that of Elita in Sam Peckinpah's Bring Me the Head of Alfredo Garcia. She also wrote the song, "Bennie's Song", which appears in the film. She was subsequently photographed nude for the July 1974 issue of Playboy magazine.

She won five Ariel Awards, including for La Viuda Negra (1977) Herod's Law (1999), and Bring Me the Head of Alfredo Garcia (2017).

In the 1980s, Vega made her debut behind the camera by writing, producing and directing a number of films. She was called to sing the songs "Amanecí en tus brazos" and "El Siete Mares" in the 1986 film Gringo mojado. Overall, she participated in 150 movies.

Personal life
Vega was born and raised in Hermosillo, Sonora, Mexico. She has a son named Arturo with singer Alberto Vázquez, with whom she had a short lived troubled relationship, but never married; and a daughter, Shaula, who is an actress and dancer, from her long lasting relationship with the actor . Vega died of cancer in Mexico City on March 9, 2021, at the age of 81.

Filmography as actress

1960: Verano violento
1963: La rabia por dentro
1966: Rage
1967: Don Juan 67
1967: Mujeres, mujeres, mujeres
1967: SOS Conspiracion Bikini
1968: El deseo llega de noche
1968: La Cama
1968: Las pecadoras
1968: Las sicodélicas – Daliliah
1968: Por mis pistolas – Lupita Sanchez
1968: Fear Chamber – Helga
1969: Cuernos debajo de La Cama – Elsa
1969: El matrimonio es como el demonio
1969: Enigma de muerte
1969: La señora Muerte – Lisa
1969: Las golfas – Oti
1969: Las impuras
1969: Las luchadoras contra el robot asesino
1969: Las Pirañas aman en Cuaresma – Lala
1969: Pacto diabólico
1970: El oficio más antiguo del mundo – Yolanda
1970: La buscona
1970: Prohibido
1971: El sabor de la venganza (1971 film) – Sara Carson
1971: La hora desnuda
1971: La primavera de los escorpiones
1971: Las reglas del juego – Verónica
1971: Temporada salvaje
1972: Basuras humanas  .... Laura
1972: El festín de la loba
1972: Fin de fiesta – Silvia
1973: The Deadly Trackers – Maria
1973: Volveré a nacer – Mónica
1974: Bring Me the Head of Alfredo Garcia – Elita
1975: El llanto de la tortuga – Diana
1976: Celestina – Melibea
1976: Drum – Marianna
1976: Joshua – Mexican Woman
1976: La India – La India
1977: Acto de posesión
1977: La viuda negra – Matea Gutiérrez
1977: María, la santa
1977: The Rhinemann Exchange''' – Anna
1978: Casa de citas1978: The Loving Ones1978: Oro rojo1979: Midnight Dolls1979: The Streets of L.A. – Anita Zamora
1980: El hombre de los hongos – Elvira
1980: Las tentadoras1980: Navajeros – Mercedes
1981: El macho bionico1981: The Pulque Tavern1981: Las mujeres de Jeremías – Tamara Sanchez
1981: Las siete cucas1982: Barbarosa  .... Josephina
1982: Una gallina muy ponedora1983: El amor es un juego extraño1983: Appearances Are Deceptive – Adriana / Adrian
1983: The Greatest American Hero – Serena Delvera
1984: Las glorias del gran Púas1984: Rituals – Maria
1984: San Judas de la Frontera1984: The Yellow Rose – Juanita Diaz
1985: El secuestro de Lola1985: Nana1986: Dos chichimecas en Hollywood1986: Gringo mojado – Mona Mur
1986: Los Amantes del Señor de la Noche – Amparo
1986: Stingray – Isabel Rodriguez
1987: The Alamo: Thirteen Days to Glory – Senora Cos
1988: Blood Screams'1989: Las borrachas1989: Salvajes1990: Discriminación maldita1990: El reportero1992: En legítima defensa1995: Manhattan Merengue! – Alfidia
1995: Señora Tentación – Tamara
1996: Los padres de hoy y del mañana – Hostess (10 episodes, 1996)
1997: Conan the Adventurer – Hag
1997: Gente bien – Mercedes
1999: La ley de Herodes – Doña Lupe
2000: Ramona – Matea (unknown episodes)
2003: Amor descarado – Nora
2004: Killer Snake – Lupe
2004: Puños rosas – La Güera
2006: Cobrador: In God We Trust – La Gitana
2006: Fuera del cielo2006: Mujer alabastrina2007: Pasión – La Paisana
2008: Arráncame la vida – Gitana
2008: Conozca la cabeza de Juan Pérez – Adivina
2008: Crepúsculo rojo – Locha
2008: Mujeres asesinas – Margarita Rascón
2008: Terminales – Emma Díaz (13 episodes, 2008)
2009: Amar – Concha
2009: Crónicas chilangas – Anita
2009: El muro de al lado – Juana
2009: El Pantera2009: Salvando al soldado Pérez2010: El Infierno - Doña Rosaura
2010: Niña de mi corazón – Belén
2014: Muchacha italiana viene a casarse – Doña Eloísa Ángeles.
2014: The Hours with You – Abu
2016: Como dice el dicho – Paloma
2017: Sin tu mirada – Dominga
2017: Érase una vez – Águenda (Episode: "Hansel y Gretel")
2018: Like – Eduarda
2019: Dora and the Lost City of Gold – Old Woman
2020: Cindy la Regia – Mercedes
2020: La casa de las flores - Victoria Aguirre

Filmography as writer, director, producer 
1980: Navajeros (producer)
1982: Una gallina muy ponedora (producer)
1986: Los amantes del señor de la noche'' (writer, producer, director)
2018–2019: "Like La Leyenda"

References

External links

Interview in La Jornada 

1939 births
2021 deaths
Ariel Award winners
20th-century Mexican actresses
21st-century Mexican actresses
Mexican film actresses
Mexican television actresses
People from Hermosillo
Deaths from cancer in Mexico
Actresses from Sonora